The post of Governor of the Vatican City State was held by Marchese Camillo Serafini from the foundation of the state in 1929 until his death in 1952. No successor was appointed, and the post itself was not mentioned in the Fundamental Law of Vatican City State issued by Pope John Paul II on 26 November 2000, which entered into force on 22 February 2001.

Even during Serafini's lifetime, the powers of the governor were limited by Pope Pius XII in 1939 by the establishment of the Pontifical Commission for Vatican City State—consisting of a number of cardinals, originally three, but later increased to seven. The president of the pontifical commission has exercised the functions that were previously attributed to the governor since 1952, and has also held the title of President of the Governorate of the Vatican City State since 2001.

External links
 Francesco Clementi: La nuova "Costituzione" dello Stato della Città del Vaticano
 Luca Martini: Le caratteristiche peculiari dello Stato della Città del Vaticano: istituzioni e nuova costituzione
 Sullo Stato della Città del Vaticano, v. F. Clementi, Città del Vaticano, Bologna, Il Mulino, 2009

Government of Vatican City